Henry Hill (13 July 1845 — 6 January 1924) was a Welsh-born New Zealand cricketer who played for Canterbury. He was born in Newport and died in Christchurch.

Hill made a single first-class appearance for the team, during the 1873–74 season, against Otago. From the upper-middle order, he scored a duck in both innings in which he batted, and took figures of 0–2 from two overs of bowling.

References

External links
Henry Hill at Cricket Archive 

1845 births
1924 deaths
New Zealand cricketers
Canterbury cricketers
Sportspeople from Newport, Wales